The Singing Boys of Pennsylvania was an American boys' choir, established in 1970 as the Pocono Boy Singers, which ceased operation in 2014. A 501(c) organization organized in 1970 as the Pocono Boy Singers, the choir was incorporated in 1972. Its post office box was located in Wind Gap, Pennsylvania, but it was physically based for many years in Stockertown, Pennsylvania. It drew its membership primarily from Monroe, Northampton, Lehigh, and Warren counties. The choir consisted of about 40 boys in grades 4 through 8. Membership was by invitation and audition.

The choir performed throughout the United States, Canada, Japan, England, Wales, and Mexico. Its website claimed an annual budget of $110,000, and 2013 Songwriter's Market listed it as having more than 100 concerts per year, paying $300–$3,000 for outright purchase of material.

The Singing Boys had a sister organization, the Keystone Girls Choir, founded in 1986. The Keystone Girls Choir initially performed with the Singing Boys; they had their first concert alone in May 1991.

The choir's founder and long-time director (1970-2014) was Dr. Kenneth Bernard Schade, a graduate of the University of Texas at El Paso, Union Theological Seminary in New York (Institute of Sacred Music, now at Yale University), and the Pennsylvania State University (Ed.D). He served many Lutheran, Episcopal and Methodist churches in the region as an organist and choirmaster for several decades.

The choir has ceased operations because in January 2015, Schade was sentenced to 4.5–10 years in prison for statutory sexual assault of a member of the boys choir and possession of child pornography.

References

External links
K. Bernard Schade v. Philip Lauer, Superior Court of Pennsylvania, 2020
K. Bernard Schade v. Pennsylvania Department of Corrections 2020
Supreme Court of Pennsylvania, Middle District 2021
Schade v. McGinley Prisoner Petitions - Habeas Corpus 2022

Boys' and men's choirs
Musical groups established in 1970
Choirs of children
Choirs in Pennsylvania